Sahuarita High School ("SHS") is a high school located in Sahuarita, Arizona under the jurisdiction of the Sahuarita Unified School District. The school is located a few miles south of Tucson.

The , $11 million ($ in  dollars) campus, built in 1998 to house 1,100 students, consists of a student services/media center; three two-story classroom buildings; an art and music building, carpentry shop; and an auto shop/technology building.

Alumni
 Anthony Birchak – professional mixed martial artist
 Jada Todd - Local Phoenix personality

References

External links
 

Public high schools in Arizona
Educational institutions established in 1967
Schools in Pima County, Arizona
1967 establishments in Arizona